Saint-Donat is a parish municipality in La Mitis Regional County Municipality in the Bas-Saint-Laurent region of Quebec, Canada. Its population in the Canada 2021 Census was 835.

History
The parish was formed around a church c. 1700 and established in 1869 as part of the Mont-Joli municipal agglomeration. Saint-Donat then separated from Mont-Joli in 1976 along with Saint-Joseph-de-Lepage and Sainte-Luce.

Demographics 

Population
Population trend:

See also
 List of parish municipalities in Quebec

References

External links
 

Parish municipalities in Quebec
Incorporated places in Bas-Saint-Laurent